Below is a list of current WNBA team rosters.

Eastern Conference

Atlanta Dream

Chicago Sky

Connecticut Sun

Indiana Fever

New York Liberty

Washington Mystics

Western Conference

Las Vegas Aces

Los Angeles Sparks

Minnesota Lynx

Phoenix Mercury

Seattle Storm

Roster
Women's sport-related lists
WNBA